Courthouse Square Historic District may refer to:

in the United States
(by state then city)
Athens Courthouse Square Commercial Historic District, Athens, Alabama
Greene County Courthouse Square District, Eutaw, Alabama
Grove Hill Courthouse Square Historic District, Grove Hill, Alabama
Chambers County Courthouse Square Historic District, LaFayette, Alabama
Marion Courthouse Square Historic District, in Marion, Alabama
Moulton Courthouse Square Historic District, Moulton, Alabama
Talladega Courthouse Square Historic District, Talladega, Alabama, NRHP-listed in Talladega County
Colbert County Courthouse Square Historic District, Tuscumbia, Alabama
Harrison Courthouse Square Historic District, Harrison, Arkansas
Ozark Courthouse Square Historic District (Ozark, Arkansas),
Ozark Courthouse Square Historic District (Ozark, Missouri)
Carrollton Courthouse Square Historic District, Carrollton, Illinois
Carthage Courthouse Square Historic District (Carthage, Illinois)
Lincoln Courthouse Square Historic District, Lincoln, Illinois
Taylorville Courthouse Square Historic District, Taylorville, Illinois
Albion Courthouse Square Historic District, Albion, Indiana
Bedford Courthouse Square Historic District, Bedford, Indiana
Courthouse Square Historic District (Bloomington, Indiana)
Crown Point Courthouse Square Historic District, Crown Point, Indiana
Johnson County Courthouse Square, Franklin, Indiana
Courthouse Square Historic District (Greencastle, Indiana)
Greenfield Courthouse Square Historic District, Greenfield, Indiana
Hartford City Courthouse Square Historic District, Hartford City, Indiana
Huntington Courthouse Square Historic District, Huntington, Indiana
Liberty Courthouse Square Historic District, Liberty, Indiana
Posey County Courthouse Square, Mount Vernon, Indiana
Hamilton County Courthouse Square, Noblesville, Indiana
Scottsburg Courthouse Square Historic District, Scottsburg, Indiana
Warsaw Courthouse Square Historic District, Warsaw, Indiana
Winchester Courthouse Square Historic District, Winchester, Indiana
Courthouse Square Historic District (Centerville, Iowa)
Harlan Courthouse Square Commercial District, Harlan, IA, listed on the NRHP in Iowa
Winterset Courthouse Square Commercial Historic District, Winterset, Iowa
Hiawatha Courthouse Square Historic District, Hiawatha, KS, listed on the NRHP in Kansas
Doniphan County Courthouse Square Historic District, Troy, Kansas
Yates Center Courthouse Square Historic District, Yates Center, Kansas
Elizabethtown Courthouse Square and Commercial District, Elizabethtown, Kentucky
Courthouse Square and Mechanics' Row Historic District, Maysville, Kentucky
Owingsville Commercial District and Courthouse Square, Owingsville, Kentucky
Paris Courthouse Square Historic District, Paris, Kentucky
Pineville Courthouse Square Historic District, Pineville, Kentucky
South Courthouse Square Historic District, Somerset, Kentucky, NRHP-listed in Pulaski County
Old Courthouse Square (Lake Providence, Louisiana)
Courthouse Square Historic District (Mason, Michigan)
Canton Courthouse Square Historic District, Canton, MS, listed on the NRHP in Mississippi
Hernando Courthouse Square District, Hernando, Mississippi, listed on the NRHP in Mississippi
Holly Springs Courthouse Square Historic District, Holly Springs, Mississippi, listed on the NRHP in Mississippi
Oxford Courthouse Square Historic District, Oxford, Mississippi
Moniteau County Courthouse Square, California, Missouri
Carthage Courthouse Square Historic District (Carthage, Missouri)
 Courthouse Square Historic District (Chillicothe, Missouri)
 Courthouse Square Historic District (Farmington, Missouri)
Fayette Courthouse Square Historic District, Fayette, Missouri
Harrisonville Courthouse Square Historic District, Harrisonville, Missouri
South Liberty Courthouse Square Historic District, Liberty, Missouri
West Liberty Courthouse Square Historic District, Liberty, Missouri
 Courthouse Square Historic District (West Plains, Missouri)
Seward County Courthouse Square Historic District, Seward, NE, listed on the NRHP in Nebraska
Orleans County Courthouse Historic District, Albion, New York
Delaware County Courthouse Square District, Delhi, New York
Northampton County Courthouse Square, Jackson, North Carolina
Chardon Courthouse Square District, Chardon, Ohio
Kenton Courthouse Square Historic District, Kenton, Ohio, listed on the NRHP in Ohio
Sidney Courthouse Square Historic District, Sidney, Ohio, NRHP-listed in Shelby County
New Cordell Courthouse Square Historic District, New Cordell, Oklahoma
Perry Courthouse Square Historic District, Perry, Oklahoma
Courthouse Square (Dayton, Oregon)
Charlotte Courthouse Square Historic District, Charlotte, Tennessee, listed on the NRHP in Tennessee
Dyersburg Courthouse Square Historic District, Dyersburg, Tennessee, listed on the NRHP in Tennessee
Pulaski Courthouse Square Historic District, Pulaski, Tennessee, listed on the NRHP in Tennessee
Shelbyville Courthouse Square Historic District, Shelbyville, Tennessee
Shelby County Courthouse Square, Center, TX, listed on the NRHP in Texas
Denton County Courthouse Square Historic District, Denton, Texas, NRHP-listed in Denton County
Trinity County Courthouse Square, Groveton, Texas, listed on the NRHP in Texas
Fayette County Courthouse Square Historic District, La Grange, Texas
Chesterfield County Courthouse and Courthouse Square, Chesterfield, Virginia
Gloucester County Courthouse Square Historic District, Gloucester, Virginia
Brunswick County Courthouse Square, Lawrenceville, Virginia
Mathews County Courthouse Square, Mathews, Virginia
Beckley Courthouse Square Historic District, Beckley, West Virginia
Courthouse Square Historic District (Lancaster, Wisconsin), listed on the NRHP in Wisconsin